The 17th Massachusetts was an infantry regiment that served in the Union Army during the American Civil War.

Service
The 17th Massachusetts was organized at Camp Schouler in Lynnfield, Massachusetts and mustered in for a three-year enlistment on July 22, 1861 under the command of Colonel Thomas J.C. Amory.

The regiment was attached to Dix's Command, Baltimore, Maryland, to March 1862. Foster's 1st Brigade, Burnside's Expeditionary Corps, to April 1862. 1st Brigade, 1st Division, Department of North Carolina, to December 1862. Amory's Brigade, Department of North Carolina, to January 1863. 1st Brigade, 1st Division, XVIII Corps, Department of North Carolina, to July 1863, Defenses of New Bern, North Carolina, Department of Virginia and North Carolina, to July 1864. Sub-District of Beaufort, North Carolina, Department of Virginia and North Carolina, to January 1865. Sub-District of Beaufort, North Carolina, Department of North Carolina, to March 1865. 3rd Brigade, 2nd Division, District of Beaufort, North Carolina, Department of North Carolina, to March 1865. 1st Brigade, Division District of Beaufort, to April 1865. 3rd Brigade, 3rd Division, XXIII Corps, to July 1865.

The 17th Massachusetts mustered out of service on July 11, 1865 at Greensboro, North Carolina.

Detailed service
Left Massachusetts for Baltimore, Md., August 23. Duty at Baltimore, Md., until March 1862. Ordered to New Bern, N.C., March 12, and duty there until December. Reconnaissance toward Trenton May 15–16. Trenton Bridge May 15. Trenton and Pollocksville Road May 22 (Company I). Expedition to Trenton and Pollocksville July 24–28. Demonstration on New Bern November 11. Foster's Expedition to Goldsboro December 11–20. Kinston December 14. Whitehall December 16. Goldsboro December 17. Provost duty at and near New Bern until April 1863. March to relief of Washington, N.C., April 7–10. Blount's Creek April 9. Expedition to Washington April 17–19. Expedition toward Kinston April 27-May 1. Wise's Cross Roads and Dover Road April 28. Expedition to Thenton July 4–8. Quaker Bridge July 6. Raid on Weldon July 25-August 1. Duty at New Bern until February 1864. Operations about New Bern against Whiting January 18-February 10, 1864. Skirmishes at Beech Creek and Batchelor's Creek February 1–3. Expedition to Washington April 18–22. Washington April 27–28. Duty at New Bern and vicinity until July 27, and at Newport Barracks until September 23. Veterans on furlough until November 10. Duty at Newport Barracks November 20, 1864 to March 4, 1865. Moved to Core Creek. Battle of Wyse Fork March 8–10, 1865. Occupation of Kinston March 15. Occupation of Goldsboro March 21. Advance on Raleigh April 9–14. Occupation of Raleigh April 14. Duty at Greensboro May 5-July 11.

Casualties
The regiment lost a total of 172 men during service; 21 enlisted men killed or mortally wounded, 4 officers and 147 enlisted men died of disease.

Commanders
 Colonel Thomas J.C. Amory
 Colonel John F. Fellows
 Colonel Henry Splaine - commanded at this rank, but not mustered

See also

 List of Massachusetts Civil War Units
 Massachusetts in the American Civil War

References
 Dyer, Frederick H.  A Compendium of the War of the Rebellion (Des Moines, IA:  Dyer Pub. Co.), 1908.
 Kirwan, Thomas. Soldiering in North Carolina (Boston: T. Kirwan), 1864.
 Kirwan, Thomas and Henry Splaine. Memorial History of the Seventeenth Regiment, Massachusetts Volunteer Infantry (Old and New Organizations) in the Civil War from 1861-1865 (Salem, MA: Salem Press Co.), 1911.
 

Military units and formations established in 1861
Military units and formations disestablished in 1865
Units and formations of the Union Army from Massachusetts